Kotick Point is the southern entrance point to Holluschickie Bay, on the west coast of James Ross Island, Antarctica. The name, recommended by the UK Antarctic Place-Names Committee, arose from association with Holluschickie Bay: Kotick was the name of The White Seal in Rudyard Kipling's The Jungle Book.

References

Headlands of James Ross Island